Stanley 'Stan' Austin Leadbetter (22 May 1937 – 13 December 2013) was an English first-class cricketer.

While undertaking his national service as a non-commissioned officer in the Royal Air Force, Leadbetter made his debut in first-class cricket for the Combined Services cricket team against Warwickshire at Edgbaston in 1956. He made two further first-class appearances the following year, against Surrey and Warwickshire. He scored a total of 112 runs across his three first-class matches, averaging 22.40, with a high score of 46. He featured regularly for the Northamptonshire Second XI from 1953–1958, but did not feature for the first team.

He died at Kettering in December 2013.

References

External links

1937 births
2013 deaths
People from North Northamptonshire
Royal Air Force airmen
English cricketers
Bedfordshire cricketers
Combined Services cricketers